Khors Air is an airline based in Kyiv, Ukraine. It operates mainly charter flights within Ukraine, and also offers flights to Europe and the Middle East from Kyiv International Airport.

History 

The airline was founded and began operations in 1990 using Ilyushin Il-76, Yakovlev Yak-40, Antonov An-24 and Antonov An-26 aircraft, since then mainly serving the CIS. In 1992, an Antonov An-12 was purchased. In 2000, Khors Air replaced its ageing fleet of Soviet aircraft with American-built McDonnell Douglas DC-9-51 aircraft and, from 2004, McDonnell Douglas MD-82.

In 2005, a Kyiv to Dubai, Male and Jakarta service was started using a Boeing 757-200ER aircraft but soon had to be halted.

In 2017, the United States proposed sanctions against Khors Air due to them leasing out aircraft to airlines in Iran.

As of 2022, the airline ceased all operations.

Destinations 
Most flights operated by the airline were non-scheduled charter flights.

Fleet 

As of June 2018, the Khors Air fleet consisted of the following aircraft:

References

External links 

 

Airlines of Ukraine
Airlines established in 1990
Charter airlines
Ukrainian companies established in 1990